Downstate New York is a region that generally consists of the southeastern and more densely populated portion of the U.S. state of New York, in contrast to Upstate New York, which comprises a larger geographic area with much sparser population distribution. While there is no widely agreed upon definition, the Downstate region, like Upstate New York, is considered to consist of several subregions, such as New York City, the Lower Hudson Valley, and Long Island. The New York State Department of Transportation (NYSDOT) defines its "Downstate Region" as including Dutchess and  Orange counties, and areas east and south; regions 9 and 10 of the inset map, plus the portions of region 8 south or east of the "8 label". Both agencies and the general public use varying definitions of the boundary between Upstate and Downstate.

Despite being a very small portion of the state's total land area, the Downstate region contains approximately two-thirds of New York's entire population. Its layout is largely urban and suburban, and constitutes New York State’s portion of the New York metropolitan area, the world’s largest urban landmass. New York City, the most populous city in the United States, is home to the United Nations headquarters, and has been described as the cultural, financial, and media capital of the world, as well as the world's most economically powerful city, and is sometimes described as the capital of the world. The Upstate New York region, conversely, which forms the vast majority of the state's land area, contains more undeveloped land, including forests and farmland.

Official usage
One official usage of the term is by the State University of New York ("SUNY") system in the name of its southernmost medical school, SUNY Downstate Medical Center, located in East Flatbush, Brooklyn. The New York State Department of Transportation also uses the term. The term is also used by the New York State Department of Corrections (“NYSDOC”) system in the name of its Downstate Correctional Facility in Fishkill, New York.

See also

New York metropolitan area

References

Regions of New York (state)